Tr3s Lunas is the 21st studio album by English musician and songwriter Mike Oldfield, released in June 2002 by Warner Music Spain. After his previous album The Millennium Bell (1999), Oldfield started work on his first release for MusicVR, a musical virtual reality project with simulator video game elements and music. The idea developed to have the Tres Lunas MusicVR feature included as part of an album package, for which Oldfield wrote and recorded new music and signed with Warner Music Spain. Tr3s Lunas saw Oldfield explore electronic and chill-out music.

Background

Title 
When translated from the Spanish language to English, the album name Tres Lunas is Three Moons.  This is reflected in the typeface on the album cover, with the letter 'e' being replaced with a numeric '3'. Oldfield stated that the title was inspired by an Italian restaurant in Ibiza (where he was living at the time) called Las Dos Lunas, which uses two mirrored C-shaped moons as a logo - as well as by the fact that the Tres Lunas game, which he created simultaneously with the music, features three moons within its landscape.

Recording 
Oldfield's sister, Sally makes a speaking appearance on this album.  The last previous Mike Oldfield album which she had appeared on was 1978's Incantations.  The main vocalist for "To Be Free" is the Jazz singer Jude Sim.  British-Asian vocalist called Amar, who first appeared on Tubular Bells III, also contributes vocals to the album.  The album was recorded at Oldfield's Roughwood Studios, with additional parts recorded at Plan 1 Studios, Munich.

The saxophone sound is played with the use of a guitar synthesizer.

The game 
Tres Lunas was the vehicle for Oldfield's first publicly released MusicVR game. It was followed by Maestro. Some of the music from the Tres Lunas game eventually ended up on Oldfield's Light + Shade album.

Artwork 
The cover is from an original idea by Hans Claesson of Kebawe.

Track listing 
 "Misty" – 3:59
 "No Mans Land" – 6:08
 "Return to the Origin" – 4:38
 "Landfall" – 2:19
 "Viper" – 4:32
 "Turtle Island" – 3:40
 "To Be Free" – 4:21
 "Fire Fly" – 3:46
 "Tr3s Lunas" – 4:35
 "Daydream" – 2:15
 "Thou Art in Heaven" – 5:22
 "Sirius" – 5:47
 "No Mans Land" (Reprise) – 2:56
 "To Be Free" (Radio edit) (Bonus track) – 3:56

Personnel 
 Mike Oldfield
 Sally Oldfield – Spoken voice
 Jude Sim – Vocals on "To Be Free"
 Amar – Vocals
 Ben Darlow – Assistant engineer
 Philip Lewis – Percussion programming (assistant at Plan 1)
 Thomas Süssmair – Percussion programming (assistant at Plan 1)

Certifications

References

External links 
 Mike Oldfield Discography - Tres Lunas at Tubular.net
 Cover from an original idea by Hans Claesson of Kebawe

Mike Oldfield albums
2002 albums
Warner Music Group albums